Scartichthys variolatus is a species of combtooth blenny found around islands in the southeast Pacific ocean, the Desventuradas Islands and the Juan Fernandez Islands.  This species reaches a length of  SL.

References

variolatus
Fish described in 1836
Endemic fauna of Chile